(born December 19, 1995) is a Japanese professional wrestler working for the Japanese professional wrestling promotion Gleat, where he is the current G-Rex Champion in his first reign. He is also known for his work in Dragon Gate, where he was a one-time Open the Brave Gate Champion.

Professional wrestling career

Independent circuit (2015–present)
Ishida worked a couple of matches outside of Dragon Gate. At Tokyo Carnival 2017, an event promoted by Tokyo Gurentai on July 17, he teamed up with Takehiro Yamamura, Cima and Eita as Over Generation, falling short to Nosawa Rongai, Minoru Fujita, Kazuhiko Masada and Kikutaro in an eight-man tag team match. On October 9, 2017, he took part in the Hbc Radio Produce Radi Pro 25th Anniversary, an event produced by the japanese independent scene portraiting twenty-five years of the Hokkaido Broadcasting, where he teamed up with Super Shisa to defeat K-ness and Shun Skywalker. Ishida also worked a couple of matches for Osaka Pro Wrestling, one of them taking place at Osaka Pro Wrestling Rainy Season Sky Fly Away on June 2, 2018, where he fell short to HUB.

Dragon Gate (2015–2022)
Ishida made his professional wrestling debut at Sapporo Teisen Hall Final Match, an event promoted by Dragon Gate on May 31, 2015, where he went in a time-limit draw against Takehiro Yamamura. At Dragon Gate Rainbow Gate 2019 on June 30, he participated in a 24-man pinfall battle royal also involving the winner Yosuke Santa Maria and other notable opponents such as Flamita, Masato Yoshino and The Bodyguard. Ishida took part in a rare ten-man tag team match contested under two-count rules on the 16th night of the Gate Of Evolution 2018 event from November 30, where he teamed up with his MaxiMuM stablemates Dragon Kid, Jason Lee, Masato Yoshino and Naruki Doi, falling short to  R.E.D. (Ben-K, Eita, Pac and Takashi Yoshida) accompanied by Daga. Ishida was part of the Over Generation stable since 2016. But on the 11th day of the Dragon Gate Rainbow Gate 2018 event from July 5, he teamed up with his stablemates Dragon Kid, Gamma and Mondai Ryu, falling short to ANTIAS (Eita, Shingo Takagi, Takashi Yoshida and Yasushi Kanda) in an eight-man elimination tag team match in which the losing unit was forced to disband. At Dragon Gate Dead Or Alive 2021 on May 5, he teamed up with his R.E.D. stablemate Kazma Sakamoto to defeat Masaaki Mochizuki and Takashi Yoshida for the Open the Twin Gate Championship.

He is known for participating in notable events of the promotion such as King of Gate, competing for the first time on the 2019 edition, placing himself in the Block C and scoring a total of four points after going against Ben-K, Yamato, Genki Horiguchi, Takashi Yoshida and Kagetora. At the 2020 edition of the event, he took part in the Block B, shared with BxB Hulk, Genki Horiguchi, Kai, Big R Shimizu, Jason Lee whom he defeated in the first round, Keisuke Okuda in the second round and Naruki Doi in the quarter-finals, but fell short to him in the next stage due to him getting a second chance in the tournament. He is currently competing in the 2021 edition in the Block C, sharing the competition with Keisuke Okuda, Yamato, Shun Skywalker, U-T and H.Y.O.

At Gate of Destiny 2020 from November 3, Ishida dropped the Open the Brave Gate Championship to Keisuke Okuda.

Championships and accomplishments

Dragon Gate
Open the Brave Gate Championship (1 time)
Open the Twin Gate Championship (1 time) – with Kazma Sakamoto
Open the Triangle Gate Championship (3 times) – with Eita and H.Y.O (2), Naruki Doi and Kota Minoura (1)
Gleat
G-Rex Championship (1 time, current)
 Pro Wrestling Illustrated
 Ranked No. 362 of the top 500 singles wrestlers in the PWI 500 in 2021
Wrestling Observer Newsletter
Ranked no. 9 on the top 10 of the 2015 Rookie Of The Year

References 

1995 births
Living people
People from Osaka
Japanese male professional wrestlers
21st-century professional wrestlers
Open the Brave Gate Champions
Open the Twin Gate Champions
Open the Triangle Gate Champions